Stranger Things is the eleventh solo studio album by the British singer/songwriter Marc Almond. It was released by Blue Star Music, in conjunction with XIII BIS Records, on 18 June 2001.

Background
According to an article in Billboard magazine, the sound of Stranger Things "finds a middle ground between the spare gothic synth-pop of Open All Night and the orchestral grandeur of 1991's Tenement Symphony. Almond employed the services of Jóhann Jóhannsson, Icelandic multi-instrumentalist, composer and producer, to produce the album. Jóhannsson also plays most of the instruments, with some assistance from other musicians from Iceland, and is responsible for many of the arrangements. The tracks "Come Out" and "Love in a Time of Science" were originally written for Jóhannsson's band DIP.

The German version of the album contains the bonus track "Amo Vitam", featuring and written by the German band Rosenstolz. This follows a prior collaboration where Almond sang guest vocals on the Rosenstolz single "Total Eclipse".

The first pressings of both the English and the German versions came in an embossed jewel case.

Critical reception

Critics generally liked the album but with reservations. The sound of the album has been described by Allmusic as "dreamy and swooning" and states that Almond "sounds in absolutely excellent voice". The Guardian doesn't fully concur with this point of view, allowing that whilst the production lends the album a "veneer of lush sophistication" it "has done little to alleviate the worst of Almond's voice". Another review agrees that the "production is lush and most of the songs sweep by with grace and style" whilst conceding that "Almond's voice is definitely an acquired taste".

Track listing

 "Glorious" (Jóhann Jóhannsson, Peter Hallgrimsson, Marc Almond) – 4:44
 "Born to Cry"	(Neal Whitmore, Almond) – 4:58
 "Come Out" (Jóhannsson, Siggi Baldursson, Sjón) – 4:52
 "Under Your Wing" (Almond, Whitmore, John Green) – 5:26
 "Lights" (Almond, Jóhannsson) – 4:17
 "Tantalise Me" (Almond, Jóhannsson) – 4:08
 "Moonbathe Skin" (Almond, Whitmore) – 4:10
 "Dancer" (Almond, Jóhannsson) – 3:27
 "When It's Your Time"	(Almond, Whitmore) – 4:14
 "End in Tears" (Almond, Jóhannsson) – 3:19
 "Love in a Time of Science" (Jóhannsson, Baldursson) – 4:54
 "Glorious (Reprise)" (Jóhannsson, Hallgrimsson, Almond) – 2:35

Bonus track (German release only)
"Amo Vitam" (AnNa R., Peter Plate, Ulf Leo Sommer) – 4:57
 Duet with the German band Rosenstolz.

Personnel

Marc Almond – vocals
Jóhann Jóhannsson – ARP Odyssey, piano, synthesizer, Farfisa, ARP Explorer, Rhodes, glockenspiel, Stylophone, Hammond organ, programming, string arrangement, orchestration
Sara Guðmundsdóttir – backing vocals
Simon Langford – extra keyboards, string arrangement
Vidar Hákon Gislason – additional programming
Siggi Baldursson – drums, percussion
Luke Gordon – additional programming
John Green – additional strings, arrangement, additional keyboards
Samuel Jon Samuelson – conducting, orchestration
Hordur Bragason – Hammond organ
Peter Hallgrimson – guitar
Neal Whitmore – string arrangement

Charts

References

2001 albums
Marc Almond albums